The City of York Green Belt is an environmental and planning policy that regulates the rural space within the Yorkshire and the Humber region of England. The York city green belt is within the county of North Yorkshire. The policy's core function is to manage development around York and the surrounding area, preserving its setting and historic character, discouraging urban sprawl, and the convergence of outer villages into the city's built up areas. It is managed by local planning authorities on guidance from central government.

Purpose 
There are five aims for the green belt around York:

 Maintain the city's historic setting and character;
 Keep the urban sprawl of York in check;
 Preserve the surrounding countryside from development;
 Stop nearby settlements converging towards each other;
 Promoting the recycling of brownfield or other urban land.

Geography
Formally created in 1980 after being an interim policy since the 1950s, the local development plan defines the green belt outer edge as being 'about 6 miles from York'. Land area taken up by the green belt is  hectares (0.2% of the total land area of England (2010). The green belt nearly covers the city except for built-up area and larger surrounding villages. It extends into the North Yorkshire districts of Hambleton, Harrogate, Ryedale, and Selby.

The rural areas and smaller villages of the district are "washed over" by the green belt, meaning there is limited development scope in these areas:Acaster Malbis, Askham Bryan, Askham Richard, Deighton, Heslington, Hessay, Holtby, Hopgrove, Knapton, Murton, Naburn and Rufforth. Because the York city green belt covers several adjacent districts, responsibility and co-ordination lies with the city and local district councils whose land is included.

See also
 Green belt (United Kingdom)

References

External links
 Interactive map of green belt land

Green belts in the United Kingdom
Environment of North Yorkshire
Geography of York
Politics of York